Stanger Manor Secondary School is a public high school located in Stanger, KwaDukuza, on the north coast of South Africa.

Academic history

The portals of Stanger Manor Secondary were opened to its first set of pupils on 21 July 1980. The first batch of matriculants sat for the Senior Certificate Examination in December 1983. The percentage pass was 82%. The percentage pass rate progressively improved to 97.5% in 1987. The number of distinctions also increased over the years and in 1987 Basil Dhaniram came twelfth in the top twenty among all the candidates in South Africa. Raveen Parbhoosing obtained the highest marks from amongst the candidates in the House of Delegates Science Olympiad and winning a sponsored trip to London to attend the Science Conference. In 1988 Camantha Reddy obtained the highest marks in the home Economics Olympiad, and the school has since been producing among the top candidates.

During the 1990s, the school celebrated 10 years since it first opened; the occasion was marked by having a celebration day at school. In these 10 years other than academic achievement the school has also produced athletes with students over the years being selected to represent Natal and South Africa in their respective categories. The physical facilities at the school have undergone upgrades over the years, including a double tennis court, a double cricket net, a Basketball/Volleyball court and a swimming pool which are the most notable improvements.

In 2005, the school celebrated 25 years since it first opened. The occasion was marked by having a celebration day at school.

In 2007, the top five learners of the top 10 in the Ilembe region were from the school, something which no other school in the region has ever done before, with the top five learners averaging close to a 100% aggregate, and a total of 8 out of the top ten were of the school. The class of 2007’s performance has won the school  a sponsorship from The Anglo American Mathematics Trust, which paid for a state of the art mathematics center which was completed in 2009; The school also allows other schools in the district to make use of it as an educational aid to learners.

In 2008, the school was again one of the best performing schools under the new curriculum statement, and the learners again featured in the top achievers among the Ilembe region, featuring 3rd, 4th and fifth, with the school gaining special praise from the department of education officials.

Since the beginning in 1980 the school has produced some of the finest learners out of all the schools in South Africa, who have contributed to the development of the country in different fields. The school continues to out perform more affluent schools which is indicative of the school's belief that with dedication there is nothing impossible, Stanger Manor Secondary are leaders in Quality Education among government schools in South Africa.

In 2011 the school once again achieved the top 5 Matrics in the Ilembe region. In 2012 the schools Matrics achieved the second, third and fourth positions in the Ilembe region. The matric class of 2018 brought huge accolades to the school. The school achieved first, third, fifth and eight position in the Ilembe district.

Sport

The school has a tennis court, netball field, football field, volleyball field and swimming pool. The school does especially well in cricket and its sport achievements are usually featured in local newspapers.

Participation in International Conference

Every year one or more students from the school are chosen to attend an international conference that is held in various parts of the world, mainly European. Countries, include the UK, Sweden and Germany.

Management

The school runs with a 5-day six period cycle which is only changed to accommodate contextual factors such as attrition etc.

Curriculum

All lessons are conducted in English. (Except for lessons in the Additional Languages). Each learner throughout the school (grades 8-12) are required to learn a minimum of 7 different subjects, most of which are compulsory. A learner in the higher grades(10-12) may choose additional extra subjects(up to 3) which are not part of the chosen course. Learners may either choose Afrikaans or Zulu as their 1st additional language.

The grade 8 and 9 subjects are a set list of:

English(Language, literature and writing),
Mathematics,
Afrikaans or Zulu(Language, literature and writing),
Life Orientation,
Technology,
Social Sciences, 
Natural Sciences
and Creative Arts

The higher grade(10-12) subjects are chosen by a course selection or by high number of subject requests. Subjects are:

Compulsory:
English(Language, literature and writing),
Afrikaans or Zulu(Language, literature and writing),
Mathematics or Mathematics literacy
and Life Orientation.
 
Student Selections:
Physical Science,
Life Science,
Accounting,
Information Technology,
Engineering Graphics and Design,
Geography,
Travel and Tourism
and Consumer Studies.

The school has over forty classrooms and specialised rooms include the Science Lab, Biology Lab, Consumer Studies room, Library, I.T. (Computer) room, Mathematics Center and two Engineering Graphics and Design rooms.

The five major blocks in the school are the Junior Block, the Senior Block, Science Block, Heads of Department (H.O.D.) Block and Technical Drawing (T.D.) Block.

In 2012/2013 the Department of Education (South Africa) announced that all South African schools will now follow the Curriculum Assessment Policy Statements (CAPS) curriculum.

Notable people

References

Manoria Bochure 1980-1990 10th Anniversary Edition

Educational institutions established in 1980
High schools in South Africa
Schools in KwaZulu-Natal
English was also introduced in Stanger Manor High School on 2 May 2007 nearly 588 people to witnessed it.By Nosi.